is a Japanese light novel series written by Kotei Kobayashi and illustrated by Riichu. SB Creative began publishing the series in January 2020, with ten volumes having been released as of January 2023. A manga adaptation by the novel's illustrator began serialization in Monthly Big Gangan in December 2021. As of January 2023, the series' individual chapters have been collected into two volumes. An anime television series adaptation by Project No.9 is set to premiere in October 2023.

Characters

Media

Light novel
Written by Kotei Kobayashi and illustrated by Riichu, SB Creative began publishing the series on January 11, 2020. As of January 2023, ten volumes have been released.

In August 2021, Yen Press announced that they licensed the series for English publication.

Volume list

Manga
A manga adaptation, illustrated by the novel's illustrator Riichu, began serialization in Square Enix's Monthly Big Gangan magazine on December 25, 2021. As of January 2023, the series' individual chapters have been collected into two tankōbon volumes.

Volume list

Anime
An anime television series adaptation was announced at the "GA Fes 2023" livestream on January 5, 2023. It is produced by Project No.9 and directed by Tatsuma Minamikawa, with scripts supervised by Keiichirō Ōchi, character designs handled by Tomoyuki Shitaya, and music composed by Go Shiina. The series is set to premiere in October 2023.

Reception
Demelza from Anime UK News liked the illustrations, while harshly criticizing the story and characters. Rebecca Silverman from Anime News Network liked the illustrations and thought the writing was "solid", while also criticizing the characters, especially Vill and Komari.

References

External links
  
  
  
 

2020 Japanese novels
2023 anime television series debuts
Adventure anime and manga
Anime and manga based on light novels
Fantasy anime and manga
GA Bunko
Gangan Comics manga
Japanese fantasy novels
Japanese webcomics
Light novels
Project No.9
Seinen manga
Upcoming anime television series
Vampires in anime and manga
Webcomics in print
Yen Press titles